Corymbia tessellaris, commonly known as carbeen or Moreton Bay ash, is a species of tree that is endemic to north-eastern Australia. It has rough, tessellated bark on the lower trunk abruptly changing to smooth, whitish bark above, narrow lance-shaped adult leaves, flower buds in groups of three or seven, white flowers and cylindrical or urn-shaped fruit

Description
The trunk is almost always straight, making up a half to two thirds of the total tree height, with a crown of slender branches. It has rough, tessellated greyish bark on the lower  of the trunk, abruptly changing to smooth whitish bark above.

Flowering mainly occurs between October and January and the flowers are white.

Taxonomy
Carbeen was first formally described in 1859 by Ferdinand von Mueller who gave it the name Eucalyptus tessellaris in Journal of the Proceedings of the Linnean Society, Botany. In 1995, Ken Hill and Lawrie Johnson changed the name to Corymbia tessellaris, publishing the change in the journal Telopea.

Distribution and habitat
Corymbia tessellaris is widespread in north-eastern Australia where it grows in undulating open forest and woodland. It is found from Cape York Peninsula and south through eastern Queensland to near Narrabri and Kyogle in northern New South Wales. It also occurs on some Torres Strait Islands and in southern New Guinea.

Uses

Indigenous uses
Yirrganydji and Djabugay people use medicine made from the tree to treat wounds and conditions such as dysentery and use the wood to make tools.

Use in horticulture
Carbeen is resistant to strong winds, heat and drought and can be propagated from seed.

Use in industry
The wood is heavy and has been used for bridge construction and making spears. The tree produces many organic compounds with industrial potential including pinenes, aromadendrene, limonene and globulol.

See also
List of Corymbia species

References

Trees of Australia
tessellaris
Myrtales of Australia
Flora of Queensland
Flora of New South Wales
Flora of New Guinea
Taxa named by Ferdinand von Mueller
Plants described in 1859